The Bostrikiny House is a historic house in Rostov-on-Don. It currently houses a branch of Sberbank. The building has the status of an object of cultural heritage of Russia of regional significance.

History
The house was built in 1914 to a design by civil engineer Semyon Vasilyevich Polipin. It initially belonged to Ivan Bostrikin and his wife Anna Bostrikina. The house was nationalized in the 1920s after the establishment of Soviet rule, and was divided into communal apartments. Sberbank of Russia took possession of the building in 1997, and it was substantially repaired after the live-in tenants had left. Sberbank's offices occupy all three floors of the Bostrikiny House.

Description 
The house has a symmetrical facade crowned with an arched attic, and is decorated in the Art Nouveau style with elements of classicism and irrationalism. The first floor is decorated with banded rustication. The second and third floors have large windows and balconies with delicate iron-cast railings. The cornice is crowned with parapet established between decorative pedestals.

References 

Buildings and structures in Rostov-on-Don
Tourist attractions in Rostov-on-Don
Cultural heritage monuments in Rostov-on-Don
Art Nouveau architecture in Russia
Houses completed in 1914
Cultural heritage monuments of regional significance in Rostov Oblast